Reviews in Mathematical Physics is a journal founded in 1989 by Huzihiro Araki of the Kyoto University. It is published by World Scientific, and covers various topics in the field of mathematical physics.

Abstracting and indexing

External links 
 

World Scientific academic journals
Mathematics journals
Physics journals
Publications established in 1989
English-language journals